WVBN-LP, analog channel 18 in Virginia Beach, Virginia, was a television station owned and operated by JBS Inc. It previously broadcast MTV2 (formerly The Box). WVBN-LP was on channel 19 until late 2002. It was owned by the Izzo Family Trust until JBS, Inc., took over in December 2002. Its signal was highly directional: all of its power was pointed towards the north and northwest to cover the northern half of Virginia Beach.

In 2013, JBS attempted to sell its trio of stations, after founder Samuel B. Jacobs II was found guilty of money laundering, mail fraud and forgery. At that time, WVBN-LP was off the air, while the other stations aired religious programming.

The station's license was cancelled by the Federal Communications Commission on July 15, 2020.

See also
WYSJ-CD

References

External links

VBN-LP
Television channels and stations established in 1995
1995 establishments in Virginia
Television channels and stations disestablished in 2020
2020 disestablishments in Virginia
Defunct television stations in the United States
VBN-LP
Mass media in Virginia Beach, Virginia